Émile Léonard Mathieu (15 May 1835, in Metz – 19 October 1890, in Nancy) was a French mathematician. He is known for his work in group theory and mathematical physics. He has given his name to the Mathieu functions, Mathieu groups and Mathieu transformation. He authored a treatise of mathematical physics in 6 volumes.
Volume 1 is an exposition of the techniques to solve the differential equations of mathematical physics,
and contains an account of the applications of Mathieu functions to electrostatics.
Volume 2 deals with capillarity. Volumes 3 and 4 deal with electrostatics and magnetostatics.
Volume 5 deals with electrodynamics, and volume 6 with elasticity. The asteroid 27947 Emilemathieu was named in his honour.

Books by Émile Mathieu
 Traité de physique mathématique (6 vols.) (Gauthier-Villars, 1873-1890)
 Dynamique Analytique (Gauthier-Villars, 1878)

References

External links
 

19th-century French mathematicians
1835 births
1890 deaths
École Polytechnique alumni
Group theorists